Zobellella is a genus of bacteria from the family of Aeromonadaceae. Zobellella is named after the marine microbiologist C. E. ZoBell.

References

Aeromonadales
Bacteria genera
Taxa described in 2006